C61 may refer to:
 , an Admirable-class minesweeper of the Mexican Navy
 Bill C-61 (39th Canadian Parliament, 2nd Session), an act to amend the Copyright Act
 Caldwell 61, a galaxy
 Caudron C.61, a French civil transport biplane 
 Fairchild C-61 Forwarder, an American military aircraft
 JNR Class C61, a class of Japanese steam locomotive
 Prostate cancer
 Reduction of Hours of Work (Textiles) Convention, 1937 of the International Labour Organization
 Ruy Lopez, a chess opening